Penn Township is one of thirteen townships in Parke County, Indiana, United States. As of the 2010 census, its population was 810 and it contained 368 housing units.

History
Penn Township was organized in 1854, and was originally built up chiefly by Quakers.

The Cox Ford Covered Bridge, Joseph Finney House, and Jackson Covered Bridge are listed on the National Register of Historic Places.

Geography
The township includes the southwest quarter of Turkey Run State Park.

Cities, towns, villages
 Bloomingdale

Unincorporated towns
 Annapolis at 
 Coke Oven Hollow at 
 Rockport at 
 Stumptown at 
(This list is based on USGS data and may include former settlements.)

Extinct towns
 Pottertown at 
(These towns are listed as "historical" by the USGS.)

Cemeteries
The township contains these four cemeteries: Bloomingdale, Coffin, DeBaun and Hethcoe.

Major highways
  U.S. Route 41
  State Road 47

School districts
 Turkey Run Community School Corporation

Political districts
 State House District 41
 State Senate District 38

References
 
 United States Census Bureau 2009 TIGER/Line Shapefiles
 IndianaMap

External links
 Indiana Township Association
 United Township Association of Indiana
 City-Data.com page for Penn Township

Townships in Parke County, Indiana
Townships in Indiana
1854 establishments in Indiana